Boys' World was a boys' comic magazine published in the UK by Longacre Press. It ran for 89 issues beginning on 26 January 1963, and in 1964 it merged with the Eagle. Boys' World featured the mythological serial strip Wrath of the Gods, painted in colour by Ron Embleton and the earliest comic strip parody of Doctor Who: Dr What and His Time Clock. Among the other artists who worked for the comic were Brian Lewis and Frank Bellamy. Writers included Harry Harrison, Sydney Jordan and Michael Moorcock. The regular Boys' World cover feature, 'What Would You Do?' - a series challenging readers to find the solution to perilous situations - inspired the similarly-titled sequence of impossible moral dilemmas posed in Moorcock's novel Breakfast in the Ruins (1972).

The headquarters of Boys' World was in London.

References

Citations

Sources

External links
 Boys' World interest page on 26Pigs

1963 comics debuts
1964 comics endings
Adventure comics
Children's magazines published in the United Kingdom
Comics magazines published in the United Kingdom
Defunct magazines published in the United Kingdom
Fleetway and IPC Comics titles
Magazines established in 1963
Magazines disestablished in 1964
Magazines published in London
Odhams Press titles